Slobozia is a city in Ialomiţa County, Romania.

Slobozia may also refer to:

 Slobozia, Argeș, a commune in Argeș County, Romania
 Slobozia, Giurgiu, a commune in Giurgiu County, Romania
 Slobozia, a village in Popeşti Commune, Argeș County, Romania
 Slobozia, a village in Stoeneşti Commune, Argeș County, Romania
 Slobozia, a village in Filipeni Commune, Bacău County, Romania
 Slobozia, a village in Stănișești Commune, Bacău County, Romania
 Slobozia, a village in Urecheşti Commune, Bacău County, Romania
 Slobozia, a village in Broscăuți Commune, Botoşani County, Romania
 Slobozia, a village in Cordăreni Commune, Botoşani County, Romania
 Slobozia, a village in Hănești Commune, Botoşani County, Romania
 Slobozia, a village in Păltiniş Commune, Botoşani County, Romania
 Slobozia, a village in Cătina Commune, Buzău County, Romania
 Slobozia, a village in Cornățelu Commune, Dâmboviţa County, Romania
 Slobozia, a village in Ciurea Commune, Iaşi County, Romania
 Slobozia, a village in Deleni Commune, Iaşi County, Romania
 Slobozia, a village in Schitu Duca Commune, Iaşi County, Romania
 Slobozia, a village in Sirețel Commune, Iaşi County, Romania
 Slobozia, a village in Voineşti Commune, Iaşi County, Romania
 Slobozia, a village in Boghicea Commune, Neamţ County, Romania
 Slobozia, a village in Fântânele Commune, Suceava County, Romania
 Slobozia, a village in Zvoriștea Commune, Suceava County, Romania
 Slobozia, a village in Gârceni Commune, Vaslui County, Romania
 Slobozia, a district in the municipality of Oneşti, Bacău County, Romania
 Slobozia, a district in the municipality of Târgu Jiu, Gorj County, Romania
 Slobozia, a district in the town of Roznov, Neamţ County, Romania
Slobozia, Moldova, a city in Transnistria, Moldova
Slobozia District, the surrounding area
Slobozia, Ştefan Vodă, a commune in Ştefan Vodă district, Moldova
Slobozia, Bălți, a former commune now part of the city of Bălți, Moldova
Slobozia Bradului, a commune in Vrancea County, Romania
Slobozia Ciorăști, a commune in Vrancea County, Romania
Slobozia Conachi, a commune in Galați County, Romania
Slobozia-Dușca, a commune in Criuleni District, Moldova 
Slobozia Mare, a commune in Cahul District, Moldova 
Slobozia Mândra, a commune in Teleorman County, Romania
Slobozia Moară, a commune in Dâmbovița County, Romania
Slobozia Nouă, several places 
Slobozia-Rașcov, a commune in Camenca District, Transnistria, Moldova 
Slobozia-Șirăuți, a commune in Briceni District, Moldova 
Slobozia Blăneasa, a village in Negrilești, Galați, Romania
Slobozia Botești, a village in Măicănești Commune, Vrancea County, Romania
Slobozia-Chișcăreni, a village in Chișcăreni Commune, Sîngerei District, Moldova
Slobozia Corni, a village in Ghidigeni Commune, Galați County, Romania
Slobozia-Cremene and Slobozia-Vărăncău, villages in Vărăncău, Soroca, Moldova
Slobozia Hănești, a village in Hănești Commune, Botoșani County, Romania
Slobozia-Hodorogea, a village in Biești Commune, Orhei District, Moldova 
Slobozia-Horodiște, a village in Horodiște, Rezina, Moldova 
Slobozia-Măgura, a village in Bursuceni Commune, Sîngerei District, Moldova
Slobozia-Medveja, a village in Medveja, Briceni, Moldova
Slobozia Oancea, a village in Oancea Commune, Galați County, Romania
Slobozia-Recea, a village in Recea, Rîșcani, Moldova
Slobozia Silișcani, a village in Mihălășeni, Botoșani, Romania
Slobozia Sucevei, a village in Grănicești Commune, Suceava County, Romania

Slobozia Bănilei, the Romanian name for Sloboda-Banyliv, Chernivtsi Oblast, Ukraine 
Slobozia Comăreștilor, the Romanian name for Sloboda-Komarivtsi, Chernivtsi Oblast, Ukraine 
Slobozia-Mihălceni, the former name of Mihălceni village, Ciorăști Commune, Vrancea County, Romania
Slobozia Rarancei, the Romanian name for Sloboda, Chernivtsi Oblast, Ukraine